Dötlingen is a municipality in the district of Oldenburg, in Lower Saxony, Germany. It is situated approximately 6 km northeast of Wildeshausen, and 25 km southeast of Oldenburg at the Hunte river. It's one of Germany's richest villages. The Nazis gave Dötlingen the title "Musterdorf von Deutschland", which means "Best village in Germany". In Dötlingen are many stone graves, and some plants and animals only exist there. Dötlingen was two times "Schönstes Dorf Deutschlands", the most beautiful village of Germany. Even if it is a beautiful place, Dötlingen is not known very much and has even in German language a very strange name. The oak tree in the middle of Dötlingen, next to the old church made of cobble stone, is over 1000 years old. The oak tree was struck by lightning and burst, but it survived.

Twin towns – sister cities
 Leens (De Marne)

References

Oldenburg (district)